The 2008 AFC Champions League knockout stage was played from 17 September to 12 November 2008. A total of eight teams competed in the knockout stage to decide the champions of the 2008 AFC Champions League.

Qualified teams
The winners of each of the seven groups in the group stage qualified for the knockout stage. West Asia Zone had four teams qualified, East Asia Zone had three plus the title holders.

 Urawa Red Diamonds (Defending champions)
 Bunyodkor (Group A winner)
 Saipa (Group B winner)
 Al-Karamah (Group C winner)
 Al Qadsia (Group D winner)
 Adelaide United (Group E winner)
 Kashima Antlers (Group F winner)
 Gamba Osaka (Group G winner)

Bracket

Quarter-finals
The first leg matches were played on 17 September, and the second leg matches were played on 24 September 2008.

|}

First Leg

Second Leg

Bunyodkor won 7–3 on aggregate.

Gamba Osaka won 4–1 on aggregate.

Urawa Red Diamonds won 4–3 on aggregate.

Adelaide United won 2–1 on aggregate.

Semi-finals
The first leg matches were played on 8 October, and the second leg matches were played on 22 October 2008.

|}

First Leg

Second Leg

Adelaide United won 3–1 on aggregate.

Gamba Osaka won 4–2 on aggregate.

Final

The first and second legs of the final were scheduled to be played on 5 November and 12 November 2008, respectively.

|}

First Leg

Second Leg

Gamba Osaka won 5–0 on aggregate.

Notes
 Match times were sorted chronologically by local time. The UTC figure given is for the time zone of the place in which the match was held (accounting for Daylight saving time in the areas in which it was in effect).

External links
 AFC Champions League (Knockout Stage Schedule)

Knockout Stage, 2008